is a Japanese football player who plays for GD Vitória de Sernache.

Club career
He made his professional debut in the Segunda Liga for Marítimo B on 17 May 2015 in a game against Sporting B.

References

External links

1995 births
Living people
Japanese footballers
Japanese expatriate footballers
Japanese expatriate sportspeople in Brazil
Japanese expatriate sportspeople in Portugal
Expatriate footballers in Brazil
Expatriate footballers in Portugal
Liga Portugal 2 players
Association football midfielders
G.D. Vitória de Sernache players